The 1970–71 Kansas Jayhawks men's basketball team represented the University of Kansas during the 1970–71 college men's basketball season.

Roster
Dave Robisch
Bud Stallworth
Roger Brown 
Pierre Russell
Aubrey Nash
Mark Williams
Bob Kivisto
Randy Canfield
Greg Douglas
Mark Mathews
Jerry House
Neal Mask

Schedule

References

Kansas Jayhawks men's basketball seasons
Kansas Jayhawks
Kansas State
Kansas State
Kansas
NCAA Division I men's basketball tournament Final Four seasons